Esports for the 2013 Asian Indoor and Martial Arts Games was held at the Incheon Samsan World Gymnasium. It took place from 29 June to 2 July 2013. Six video games were chosen to be part of this Indoor and Martial Arts Games, FIFA 13, Need for Speed: Shift 2 Unleashed, StarCraft II: Heart of the Swarm, Tekken Tag Tournament 2, League of Legends and Special Force.

Medalists

Medal table

Results

FIFA 13

Group stage
29–30 June

Group A

Group B

Group C

Group D

Knockout stage

Need for Speed: Shift 2 Unleashed

Preliminary round
30 June

Final round
1 July

StarCraft II: Heart of the Swarm

Group stage

Group A
29–30 June

Group B

Knockout stage

Tekken Tag Tournament 2

Group stage

Group A
29–30 June

Group B

Knockout stage

League of Legends

Group stage
29 June

Tiebreaker

Knockout stage

Final

Special Force

Group stage
29 June

Knockout stage

References

External links
Official website

2013
2013 Asian Indoor and Martial Arts Games events
2013 in esports